Grandmother (also known as Lola) is a 2009 French-Filipino independent drama film  directed by  Brillante Mendoza. It was entered into the main competition at the 66th edition of the Venice Film Festival.

Cast   
    
     Anita Linda as Lola Sepa
     Rustica Carpio as Lola Puring
     Tanya Gomez  as  Ditas
     Jhong Hilario as Bebong
     Ketchup Eusebio as  Mateo  
 Benjie Filomeno as Domeng  
 Bobby Jerome Go  as Jay Jay  
 Geraldine Villamil as Virgie  
 Nico Nullan as Nico  
 Hope Matriano as Linda

References

External links  

 

2009 films
Filipino-language films
2000s Tagalog-language films
2009 drama films
Films directed by Brillante Mendoza
Philippine New Wave
Philippine drama films